The 2016 Copa Libertadores first stage was played from 2 to 11 February 2016. A total of 12 teams competed in the first stage to decide six of the 32 places in the second stage of the 2016 Copa Libertadores.

Draw
The draw of the tournament was held on 22 December 2015, 20:30 PYST (UTC−3), at the CONMEBOL Convention Centre in Luque, Paraguay.

Starting from this season, teams were seeded by the newly established CONMEBOL ranking of the Copa Libertadores (except for teams from Mexico which were not ranked and thus seeded last in all draws), taking into account of the following three factors:
Performance in the last 10 years, taking into account Copa Libertadores results in the period 2006–2015
Historical coefficient, taking into account Copa Libertadores results in the period 1960–2005
Local tournament champion, with bonus points awarded to domestic league champions of the last 10 years

For the first stage, the 12 teams were drawn into six ties containing a team from Pot A and a team from Pot B, with the former hosting the second leg. The teams were seeded based on their CONMEBOL ranking (shown in parentheses). Teams from the same association could not be drawn into the same tie.

Format

In the first stage, each tie was played on a home-and-away two-legged basis. If tied on aggregate, the away goals rule would be used. If still tied, extra time would not be played, and the penalty shoot-out would be used to determine the winner (Regulations Article 5.2). The six winners of the first stage advanced to the second stage to join the 26 direct entrants.

Matches
The first legs were played on 2–4 February, and the second legs were played on 9–11 February 2016.

|}

Match G1

Santa Fe won 6–1 on aggregate and advanced to the second stage (Group 8).

Match G2

Tied 2–2 on aggregate, Huracán won on away goals and advanced to the second stage (Group 4).

Match G3

Racing won 3–2 on aggregate and advanced to the second stage (Group 3).

Match G4

River Plate won 2–0 on aggregate and advanced to the second stage (Group 2).

Match G5

Tied 2–2 on aggregate, Independiente del Valle won on away goals and advanced to the second stage (Group 5).

Match G6

São Paulo won 2–1 on aggregate and advanced to the second stage (Group 1).

References

External links
 
Copa Libertadores 2016, CONMEBOL.com 

1